The Royal Kingdoms of Ghana, Mali, and Songhay: Life in Medieval Africa is a 1993 book by Patricia and Fredrick McKissack. It is a history of Western Africa and the kingdoms that flourished there from 700AD to 1700AD.

Reception
School Library Journal in its review of The Royal Kingdoms of Ghana, Mali, and Songhay wrote that while "The authors have attempted something unique", they found shortcomings with the extensive use of oral history as it "prevents the line between history and mythology from being clearly drawn." The review concluded "In spite of its limitations, this title will be an important addition to most collections." Booklist commended its coverage of slavery issues; they described it as "not easy reading" and not "the best of the McKissacks' work."

A Publishers Weekly review wrote "Because much of the available information about medieval Africa is sketchy at best, the narrative is sometimes confusing, especially when the authors combine divergent theories or rely on myth and legend to fill holes in the historical record. Still, their volume contains insightful information about an important period in both African and world history."

Awards
1994 Africana Older Children Book Award - Honor
1994 CCBC Choice
1997 NCTE Kaleidoscope book.

References

External links

 University of Pennsylvania - African Studies Center Books for Middle and High School
 Library holdings of The Royal Kingdoms of Ghana, Mali, and Songhay

1993 children's books
American children's books
Children's history books
History of West Africa
Books by Patricia McKissack
History of Ghana
History of Mali
Songhai Empire